Vahid Alaghband is a British-Iranian international commodities trader and entrepreneur based in London. He is founder and chairman of Mayfair-based Balli Group PLC. In 2008  the Sunday Times Rich List estimated his personal fortune at £130 million.

He was educated in Switzerland and the USA, where he received his BS and MS degrees in Industrial Engineering and Operations Research at Cornell University, He is a member of the Clinton Global Initiative, a trustee of Asia House London and an International Council Member of Asia Society New York.

Vahid Alaghband was formerly Chair of The Iran Heritage Foundation, a non-political UK registered charity with the mission to promote and preserve the history, languages and cultures of Iran and the Persian world.

References

Living people
Cornell University College of Engineering alumni
Year of birth missing (living people)